is a 2020 Japanese romantic comedy film based on the webmanga series of the same name, directed by Yuichi Fukuda and distributed by Toho. It stars Mitsuki Takahata as Narumi and Kento Yamazaki as Hirotaka. It was released in Japanese theaters on February 7, 2020.

Plot
Narumi Momose is a female office worker who hides her fujoshi otaku lifestyle.  At her new workplace she meets her old childhood friend Hirotaka, a handsome and capable company man who is a game otaku.  The two seem perfect for each other, but love is difficult for otaku.

Cast
Mitsuki Takahata as Narumi Momose
Kento Yamazaki as Hirotaka Nifuji
 Nanao as Hanako Koyanagi
 Takumi Saitoh as Taro Kabakura
 Kento Kaku as Shinji Sakamoto
 Tsuyoshi Muro as Bartender 
 Jiro Sato as Kunio Ishiyama
 Yumi Wakatsuki as Miku
 Mio Imada as Yuki Morita
Maaya Uchida as Herself

Production
On July 26, 2018, a video promoting the sixth volume of the manga revealed that a live-action movie adaptation was in production.

On September 18, 2018, the lead actors were announced: Mitsuki Takahata and Kento Yamazaki to play Narumi and Hirotaka.

First filming began on October 3, 2018 at Sake Dojo Jinya Nakamoto store.

Reception

Wotakoi: Love Is Hard for Otaku earned $11,702,371 at the box office.

References

External links
 

2020 films
2020s Japanese films
2020s science fiction comedy films
2020 romantic comedy films
2020s teen comedy films
Films set in the 21st century
Films set in the 2010s
Films set in 2018
Films set in Tokyo
Live-action films based on manga
Japanese romantic comedy films
Japanese science fiction films
Japanese teen films
Toho films
Films about fandom
Otaku in fiction
2020s teen romance films